Jean Dunn may refer to
Jean Dunn (diplomat), Australian diplomat
Jean Dunn (cyclist), British track cyclist